The 1997–98 Real Sociedad season was the 88th season in the club's history and the 30th consecutive season in the top-flight of Spanish football league.

Competitions

Overview

La Liga

League table

Results summary

Results by round

Matches

Copa del Rey

Statistics

Goalscorers

References 

Real Sociedad seasons
Real Sociedad